Thela Ngobeni (born 4 February 1989) is a South African footballer who plays as goalkeeper for Premier Soccer League club Swallows fC as a regular goalkeeper.

Career
Thela Ngobeni has played for many Premier Soccer League clubs including The Free State Stars, Mamelodi Sundowns and Kaiser Chiefs. Thela had to join Highland Park as he was not mainly included in the squad of Mamelodi Sundowns.

Tournaments Form

Career statistics

Club 

 As of match played 23 August 2021

References

External links

1989 births
Living people
Association football goalkeepers
South African soccer players
Kaizer Chiefs F.C. players
Mamelodi Sundowns F.C. players
Free State Stars F.C. players
Highlands Park F.C. players
South African Premier Division players